The following is a timeline of the history of the city of Fortaleza, Ceará, Brazil.

Prior to 20th century

 1649 - Fortaleza founded by Dutch.
 1810 - Town becomes capital of Ceará.
 1823 - Fortaleza attains city status.
 1846 -  built.
 1854 - Bishopric established.
 1864 -  (seminary) founded.
 1872 - Population: 42,458.
 1877 - Drought.
 1887 -  (learned society) founded.
 1890 - Population: 40,902.
 1894 -  (literary society) founded.

20th century

 1910 - Theatro José de Alencar (theatre) opens.
 1915 - Drought.
 1918 - Fortaleza Sporting Club founded.
 1919 -  established.
 1920 - Population: 78,536
 1928 - O Povo newspaper begins publication.
 1929 -  founded.
 1932
  established.
 Drought.
 1933 - Ferroviário Atlético Clube (football team) formed.
 1940 - Population: 180,901.
 1942 - Drought.
 1946 - Regional Labor Court headquartered in city.
 1950 - Population: 205,052.
 1957 - Tribuna do Ceará newspaper begins publication.
 1960
 Population: 514,818.
 City plan presented by Helio Modesto.
 1962 - Pirambu shantytown rally.
 1966 - Pinto Martins – Fortaleza International Airport terminal built.
 1970 - Population: 520,175 city; 828,763 urban agglomeration.
 1971 - Integrated Development Plan for the Metropolitan Region of Fortaleza presented.
 1973 - Castelão stadium opens.
 1974 -  in business.
 1980
  established.
 Population: 1,308,919.
 1981
 TV Cidade Fortaleza begins broadcasting.
 Diário do Nordeste newspaper begins publication.
 1982
 Federacao de Bairros y Favelas de Fortaleza (community organization) founded.
  shopping center in business.
 1989 - Cocó Park established.
 1990 -  becomes mayor.
 1991
 Cearah Periferia (housing organization) established.
 Population: 1,765,794.
 1992 -  (craft center) built.
 1993
  established.
 Population: 1,846,955 (estimate).
 1997 - City divided into 7 administrative regions.(pt)
 1999 - Dragão do Mar Center of Art and Culture inaugurated.

21st century

 2005 - Luizianne Lins becomes mayor.
 2007 -  (building) restored.
 2010 - Population: 2,452,185.
 2012
 Fortaleza Metro begins operating.
 October:  held.
 2013
 June: Protest.
 Roberto Cláudio becomes mayor.
 2014 - July: International 6th BRICS summit held in city.
 2016 - 2 October:  held.
 2019 - 2 June: Dedication of LDS Fortaleza Brazil Temple, 164th in the church.

See also
 Fortaleza history
 
 List of mayors of Fortaleza

References

This article incorporates information from the Portuguese Wikipedia.

Bibliography

in English

in Portuguese

External links
 

Fortaleza
Fortaleza